The Safe Amplification Site Society, also known as Safe Amp or SASS is a non-profit organization that promotes the legitimacy of music and arts within Vancouver for participants of all ages. Safe Amp is a member-based organization, and relies on donations for funding. Many of the directors of Safe Amp are prominent musicians in the Vancouver community, including co-founder and general director Ryan McCormick of Collapsing Opposites and They Shoot Horses, Don't They?. The organization was created with inspiration from such organizations as Seattle's The Vera Project and The Smell in Los Angeles.

A key initiative for Safe Amp has been establishing a "permanent, legal, alcohol-free, all-ages space for music and arts events" in Vancouver. General advocacy on this issue is also a key activity; Safe Amp aims to put pressure on the municipal and provincial governments and British Columbia's Liquor Control and Licensing Board to amend provincial liquor laws. Recent years have seen many popular live music venues in Vancouver close due to strict liquor licensing regulations, gentrification, the rapid development of condominiums, or noise complaints in the densely populated city centre.

Safe Amp is known for its do-it-yourself all-ages events, which have included concerts and film screenings. In 2012, Safe Amp organized a series of workshops and festivals under the title "Skills for Performing Artists through Community Engagement" ("S.P.A.C.E. Camp") that included notable speakers such as Fugazi/Minor Threat frontman Ian MacKaye and Nardwuar the Human Serviette, performers including Calvin Johnson and The Evaporators, and representatives from organizations including Mint Records and K Records.

The organization currently operates a part-time temporary venue in Vancouver's Grandview-Woodland neighbourhood in the former Astorino's dining hall at 1739 Venables Street.

References

External links 
 Safe Amplification Site Society

Companies based in Vancouver
Music venues in Vancouver
Social centres
Youth-led media